List of albums released or distributed by Cash Money Records.

1990s

1992
Kilo-G - The Sleepwalker

1993
Lil' Slim - The Game Is Cold
B-32(now known as Baby/Birdman) - I Need A Bag Of Dope
U.N.L.V. - 6th & Baronne
PxMxWx - Legalize "Pass Tha Weed"
Ms. Tee - Chillin' On Tha Corner
Pimp Daddy - Still Pimpin1994
Lil' Slim - Powder $hop
U.N.L.V. - Straight Out Tha Gutta
PxMxWx - High Life
Mr. Ivan - 187 In "A" Hockey Mask

1995
Lil' Slim - Thug'n & Pluggin'''
M$. Tee - Having Thing$!!U.N.L.V. - Mac Melph CalioB.G.'z - True StoryKilo G - The Bloody CityTec-9 - Straight From Tha Ramp!!1996
U.N.L.V. - Uptown 4 LifePimp Daddy - Pimp'n Ain't E-ZMs. Tee - Female BallerThe BG's - Chopper City1997
Magnolia Shorty - Monkey On Tha D$ckJuvenile - Solja RagsB.G. - It's All On U, Vol 1Hot Boys - Get It How U Live!!B.G. - It's All On U, Vol. 2U.N.L.V. - Greatest Hits With New Songs1998
Big Tymers - How You Luv ThatBig Tymers - How You Luv That, Vol. 2Juvenile - 400 Degreez1999
B.G. - Chopper City In The GhettoHot Boys - Guerrilla WarfareLil Wayne - Tha Block Is HotJuvenile - Tha G-Code2000s

2000
Big Tymers - I Got That WorkCash Money Millionaires - Platinum InstrumentalsCash Money Millionaires - Baller Blockin'B.G. - CheckmateLil Wayne - Lights Out2001
Turk - Young & Thuggin'Juvenile - Project EnglishMack 10 - Bang Or Ball2002
Big Tymers - Hood RichLil Wayne - 500 DegreezCash Money Millionaires - Undisputed (soundtrack)Birdman (as Baby) - BirdmanCash Money Millionaires - Platinum Hits (Vol. 1)2003
Hot Boys - Let 'Em BurnBoo & Gotti - Perfect TimingBig Tymers - Big Money HeavyweightJuvenile - Juve The Great2004
Teena Marie - La Doña
Juvenile - The Greatest HitsLil Wayne - Tha CarterMannie Fresh - The Mind of Mannie Fresh2005
Birdman - Fast MoneyLil Wayne - Tha Carter II2006
Teena Marie - SapphireBirdman & Lil Wayne - Like Father, Like Son2007
Birdman - 5 ★ StunnaLil Wayne - The Leak EP
Cash Money Millionaires - 10 Years Of Bling (Vol. 1)2008
Cash Money Millionaires - 10 Years Of Bling (Vol. 2)Lil Wayne - Tha Carter IIIKevin Rudolf - In The City2009
Drake - So Far Gone EP
Birdman - Pricele$$Jay Sean - All or NothingYoung Money - We Are Young MoneyMack 10 - Soft White

2010s

2010
Lil Wayne - RebirthDrake - Thank Me LaterKevin Rudolf - To the SkyLil Wayne - I Am Not a Human BeingNicki Minaj - Pink Friday2011
DJ Khaled - We the Best ForeverLil Wayne - Tha Carter IVGlasses Malone - Beach CruiserDrake - Take Care2012
Tyga - Careless World: Rise of the Last KingNicki Minaj - Pink Friday: Roman ReloadedDJ Khaled - Kiss The RingNicki Minaj - Pink Friday: Roman Reloaded – The Re-Up2013
Lil Wayne - I Am Not a Human Being IITyga - Hotel CaliforniaPJ Morton - New OrleansAce Hood - Trials & TribulationsYMCMB - Rich Gang Jay Sean - Neon Drake - Nothing Was the Same  DJ Khaled - Suffering from Success2014
Young Money - Young Money: Rise of an EmpireAustin Mahone - The SecretRich Gang - Rich Gang: Tha Tour Pt. 1Nicki Minaj - The Pinkprint2015
Drake - If You're Reading This It's Too LateChris Brown X Tyga - Fan of a Fan: The AlbumGlasses Malone - Glass House 2: Life Ain't Nothin' ButDrake & Future - What a Time to Be AliveJacquees - Quemix 22016
Birdman & Jacquees - Lost At SeaJacquees - MoodDrake - Views2017
Drake - More LifeJacquees - Since You Playin
Karine Hannah - Anytime EP2018
Rich Gang- Before Anythang (Music from the Motion Picture)Jacquees - 4275Drake - ScorpionNicki Minaj - QueenBirdman & Jacquees - Lost at Sea 22019
Birdman & Juvenile - Just Another GangstaJacquees - King of R&BJacquees - Christmas in Decatur2020s

2020
Blueface - Find the Beat2022
Nicki Minaj - Queen Radio: Volume 1Jacquees - Sincerely For YouPlatinum albums
1998: 400 Degreez - Juvenile (4× Platinum)
1999: Chopper City in the Ghetto - B.G.
1999: Guerrilla Warfare - Hot Boys
1999: Tha G-Code - Juvenile
1999: Tha Block is Hot - Lil Wayne
2000: I Got That Work - Big Tymers
2002: Hood Rich - Big Tymers
2003: Juve the Great - Juvenile
2004: Tha Carter - Lil Wayne
2005: Tha Carter II - Lil Wayne (2× Platinum)
2008: Tha Carter III - Lil Wayne (3× Platinum)
2010: Thank Me Later - Drake 
2010: Pink Friday  -   Nicki Minaj (3× Platinum)
2011: Tha Carter IV - Lil Wayne (2× Platinum)
2011: Take Care - Drake (4× Platinum)
2012: Pink Friday: Roman Reloaded - Nicki Minaj (2× Platinum)
2013: Nothing Was the Same - Drake (3× Platinum)
2014: The Pinkprint - Nicki Minaj (2× Platinum)
2015: If You're Reading This It's Too Late - Drake (2× Platinum)
2015: What a Time to Be Alive - Drake & Future
2016: Views - Drake (3× Platinum)
2018: Scorpion - Drake 
2018: Queen - Nicki Minaj

Gold albums
2000: Checkmate - B.G.
2000: Lights Out - Lil Wayne
2000: Baller Blockin' (soundtrack) - Cash Money Millionaires
2001: Young & Thuggin' - Turk
2001: Project English - Juvenile
2002: Birdman - Baby
2002: 500 Degreez - Lil Wayne
2003: Big Money Heavyweight - Big Tymers
2006: Like Father, Like Son - Birdman & Lil Wayne
2009: So Far Gone - Drake
2009: We Are Young Money - Young Money
2010: Rebirth - Lil Wayne
2013: I Am Not a Human Being II'' - Lil Wayne

References

Discographies of American record labels
Hip hop discographies